St John of God Midland Public and Private Hospitals is a health care facility in Midland, Western Australia which opened in November 2015.

St John of God Health Care built and operates the hospitals under a public-private partnership with the Western Australian state government. St John of God Midland Public Hospital has replaced the nearby Swan District Hospital.

St John of God Midland Public and Private Hospitals are divisions of St John of God Health Care, a Catholic not-for-profit health care group, serving communities with hospitals, home nursing, and social outreach services throughout Australia, New Zealand and the wider Asia-Pacific region.

History
Since 1954 the Midland area has been served by Swan District Hospital, which initially opened as a maternity hospital, and expanded to a general hospital in 1963. The hospital was further developed in 1971 and 2001. 

In September 2005, the then Health Minister Jim McGinty announced that the hospital would be upgraded to a 326-bed general hospital, either through redevelopment of the existing campus, or construction of a new campus in Midland. He confirmed in November 2005 that a new hospital would be built at the site of the former Midland Railway Workshops.

In March 2010 Health Minister Kim Hames confirmed that the new $360 million Midland Health Campus would be provided by a private operator, under a public-private partnership. Expressions of interest were called for in October 2010, with St John of God Health Care announced as the campus operator on 14 June 2012. St John of God Health Care's plan included a 60-bed private hospital, which some shared services with a 307-bed public hospital. 

Construction began in August 2012, and the hospital opened on 24 November 2015 with Swan District Hospital closing at the same time.

Curtin University has commenced construction of a new medical campus to be based near St John of God Midland Public and Private Hospitals. The campus is expected to be operational by late 2019.

Services
Midland Public Hospital provides a range of medical and surgical services. The public hospital includes an emergency department, critical care unit, maternity unit, neonatology unit, paediatric unit, mental health unit, and various clinical support services. The private hospital provides specialist medical and surgical care for both inpatients and day surgery patients.

Services not offered 
St John of God Health Care, in accordance with its Catholic values, will not provide some procedures and services, including abortion, sterilisation, contraception, and assisted reproductive technology. In April 2012, the state government expected that this would affect approximately 250 out of 29,000 patients in the hospital's first year after opening. Terry O'Gorman, president of the Australian Council for Civil Liberties, said that this would compromise the principle of secular public services, and called for contract conditions to require patients to be referred elsewhere. The Opposition's health spokesman, Roger Cook, called for the government to cancel the contract with St John of God Health Care.  Subsequently, the government revealed that termination, sterilisation, and contraceptive procedures would be performed by another service provider within the public hospital. Assisted reproductive technology, which was not offered at Swan District Hospital, remained at King Edward Memorial Hospital.

Social outreach 
St John of God Social Outreach provides a range of community care services in the Midland community, including:
 Care for Aboriginal women and their families when they are pregnant through the Moort Boodjari Mia service.
 St John of God Raphael Services provides perinatal infant mental health care and undertakes research. Staffed by mental health clinicians, Raphael Services provide free support for parents and families affected by anxiety, depression and other mental health difficulties during pregnancy and in the postnatal period. The services also provide counselling and support for parents undergoing prenatal testing or who have experienced pregnancy loss.

References

External links
 St John of God Midland Public Hospital - official website
 St John of God Midland Private Hospital - official website

Hospitals in Perth, Western Australia
Hospitals established in 2015
Midland, Western Australia
St John of God Health Care